John Richard Brinsley Norton, 5th Baron Grantley, FSA, FRNS (1 October 1855 – 5 August 1943), was a British peer from an English landowning family. He became known also as an antiquary and a numismatist.

Early life
Norton was born in Florence, Italy, the son of Thomas Norton, 4th Baron Grantley and his wife, Maria, née Federigo, and a grandson of Caroline Norton, the writer. He was educated at Highgate School from 1867 until 1869, and then at Harrow School and the University of Dresden. He inherited his father's title in 1877 and was at some time a captain in the Middlesex Yeomanry.

Estates
Grantley was a Fellow of the Society of Antiquaries of London, the Royal Numismatic Society and the British Numismatic Society. His country seats were Weeke Manor in Winchester and Markenfield Hall in Ripon. He also owned Elton Manor in Nottinghamshire for a time, but seems hardly to have lived there. He purchased the Red Rice estate in 1913.

Family
In 1879, Grantley married Katharine Buckner Norton, née McVickar (died 1897), the former wife of his cousin, Charles Grantley Campbell Norton. She was the daughter of Commodore William Henry McVickar, US Navy, of New York. They had six children.
Hon. Joan Mary Conyers Norton (10 November 1879 – 22 July 1942), married 11 February 1903 Edmund Henry Bevan JP, of Hilston Park, Monmouthshire (died 3 November 1945), son of Thomas Bevan of Stone Park, Greenhithe, and had issue.
Hon. Eleanour Trehane Norton (18 July 1881 – 16 March 1951)
Hon. Winifred Chapple Norton (18 July 1881 – 11 July 1914), married 26 June 1907 William Galbraith Tennant, eldest son of John Tennant, of The Boltons, London, and had issue.
Hon. Katharine Edith Carlotta Norton (18 December 1883 – 9 February 1961)
Hon. [unnamed] Norton (born and died 25 January 1889)
Hon. Richard Henry Brinsley Norton, later 6th Baron Grantley (1892-1954)

He married secondly, in 1899, Alice Jones (died 1942), the illegitimate daughter of Thomas Jones, 7th Viscount Ranelagh.

On Grantley's death in 1943, his titles passed to his only surviving son, Richard Henry Brinsley Norton (6th Lord Grantley), a film-maker and husband of Jean Mary Kinloch.

Arms

Sources
Obituary – The Times, 6 August 1943

External links

5th Baron Grantley

1855 births
1943 deaths
British numismatists
Fellows of the Society of Antiquaries of London
Middlesex Yeomanry officers
People educated at Highgate School
People educated at Harrow School
John 5